Jiba may refer to:

Jiba (Tenrikyo), the sacred spot where Tenrikyo adherents believe humankind was conceived
Jiba language, a Jukunoid language of Nigeria
Jiba, Texas, an unincorporated community in Kaufman County, Texas
Maka Jiba, the ruler of Bundu in West Africa between around 1720 and 1764